Jo Min-ki (November 5, 1965 – March 9, 2018) was a South Korean actor. He is best known for his roles in the television series Love and Ambition, East of Eden, Queen Seondeok, and Flames of Desire. He was also a noted photographer and published two books and held solo exhibitions,.  In addition since 2010 he was an assistant professor at Cheongju University.

Following high-profile accusations of sexual misconduct from numerous students, Jo was found dead at an underground parking lot in Seoul in an apparent suicide on March 9, 2018.

Controversy

Sexual harassment allegations
On February 22, 2018, Jo Min-ki was accused of sexually harassing his students, which he initially denied. It was then revealed that he had resigned from a teaching post at Cheongju University, and dropped out of his upcoming drama Children of a Lesser God. A week later, Jo apologized and admitted to the allegations. It was confirmed that Jo would be investigated by the police and was due to turn himself in for questioning by Monday March 12, 2018. Shortly before his death, police announced that he was banned from leaving the country during the investigation. Following Jo's death, it was announced he had written and sent a written apology on February 26, however his agency decided not to release it and instead released an official statement of apology.

Death 
Jo Min-ki was found dead from an apparent suicide by hanging on March 9, 2018, in an underground parking lot near his home in Gwangjin District of Seoul. Jo left a six-page suicide note in which he apologized to his family and students, although the police have declined to release the full contents of the note. A private funeral was held for Jo at the Konkuk University Hospital Funeral Home in Seoul.

Filmography

TV series

Variety shows

Film
 The Attorney (2013) – Prosecutor Kang Young-cheol
 Love 911 (2012) – chief doctor (cameo appearance)
 A Piano on the Sea (2011)
 Astro Boy (2010) – Dr. Tenma (voice, Korean dubbing)
 The Cut (2007) – Professor Han Ji-woo
 Short Time (2005) – section head Jo (cameo appearance)
 First Kiss (1998) – Won-joong / Kyeong-dong
 Scent of a Man (1998) – Jung Chul-min
 The Girl for Love and The One for Marriage (1993) – Sung-min
 First Love (1993) – Kim Moon-soo
 A Foolish Lover (1992) – Han-il
 Death Song (1991) – Hong Hae-sung

Theater
 Forest Fire (2011) - Gyubok
 A Midsummer Night's Dream (2009)
 The Seagull (2004, 2007) - Boris Alexeyevich Trigorin

Discography

Bibliography
 Photo Album of Jo's Wandering (2008)
 Happy to Have Found You (2005)

Awards
 2008 MBC Drama Awards: Excellence Award, Actor (East of Eden)
 2007 Inter-Parliamentarians for Social Service: Special Volunteer Award
 2002 KBS Drama Awards: Excellence Award, Actor (Hard Love)
 2001 MBC Drama Awards: Excellence Award, Actor (Everyday with You, Sweet Bear)
 1996 SBS Drama Awards: Excellence Award, Actor (City Men and Women)

References

External links
 
 

1965 births
2018 deaths
2018 suicides
South Korean male film actors
South Korean male television actors
Male actors from Seoul
Chung-Ang University alumni
Suicides by hanging in South Korea